Kurd von Schlözer (original name Conrad Nestor von Schlözer; 5 January 1822, in Lübeck, Free City of Lübeck – 13 May 1894, in Berlin, Germany) was an imperial German historian, diplomat and German Ambassador to the United States from 1871 to 1882.

Family
Schlözer was the son of Lübeck merchant, and Russian Consul-General Karl von Schlözer. Like his older brother Nestor of Schlözer, he also was named for the Russian saint Nestor of Kiev, the author of the Chronicle of Nestor, who had published his grandfather, the court counselor and professor August Ludwig Schlözer. Dorothea Schlözer was his aunt.

Kurd von Schlözer remained unmarried and childless.

Life
After visiting the Katharineum of Lübeck, and the study of oriental studies and history at Hanoverian Göttingen and Berlin, Schlözer moved first to Paris and worked as a publicist.

Through the mediation of Ernst Curtius and the Princess Augusta, he was accepted without the customary legal training, into the Prussian diplomatic service. 
For several years he worked in the Foreign Ministry in Berlin, and wrote several historical treatises in addition to his work, Chasot including the Hanseatic League, the German-Russian history and a biography of the Count. 
As an author, he is attributed to the group of young Lübeck reformers :de:Jung-Lübeck. 
In 1857, he was sent to St. Petersburg as a second Secretary of Legation.

In 1863 he was in Copenhagen, and in 1864 was in Rome. 
He was secretary of the Prussian ambassador at the Holy See, and developed an extensive network of artists and church representatives. 
In 1867, he was Chargé d'affaires in a difficult political situation, between the Papal States and the Kingdom of Italy.

Following a mission on behalf of the North German Confederation to Mexico that led to the conclusion of a commerce and navigation treaty, Schlözer was appointed in 1871 as the first charge d'affaires of the German Empire in Washington, D.C. 
In letters and reports, he gave insights into the internal political situation of the United States. He maintained contact with German-American groups and individuals, including especially to Carl Schurz, and was universally liked.

In preparation for the resumption broken diplomatic relations between the Empire and the Holy See, he traveled to Rome in 1878 and 1881, and in 1882 was appointed as the Prussian envoy to Pope Leo XIII. In the preparation and implementation of the laws 1886/87, ending Kulturkampf, Schlözer experienced the peak of his diplomatic career.

A little later, after the dismissal of Bismarck, and probably at the instigation of Friedrich von Holstein, he retired in 1892.

Schlözer remained in Rome, and died shortly after his final return to Germany in Berlin in 1894. He was buried in the cemetery No. IV of the Jerusalem Church and New Church parishes on Bergmannstaße, where his tomb, designed by Bernhard Sehring today is maintained as a memorial grave of Berlin.

Works
Jugendbriefe. Stuttgart 1920
Petersburger Briefe. Stuttgart 1921
Römische Briefe. Stuttgart 1912
Mexikanische Briefe. Stuttgart 1913
Amerikanische Briefe. Stuttgart 1925
Letzte römische Briefe. Stuttgart 1924

References

External links
"Kurd von Schlözer", German wikipedia
"ADB:Schlözer, Kurd von", Wikisource
"Bismarck’s Conception of a modus vivendi with Rome (December 19, 1882) ", GHDI

1822 births
1894 deaths
Writers from Lübeck
Ambassadors of Germany to the United States
19th-century German historians
19th-century German male writers
German male non-fiction writers